Guilfoyle is an Irish surname. It originates from Gaelic Mac Giolla Phoil, meaning "son (or descendant) of the follower of St. Paul". They were once a chief clan in Kings County, now known as County Offaly.

The surname may refer to:

 Brendan Guilfoyle (born 1984), Irish rugby league player
 George Henry Guilfoyle (1913–1991), American prelate of the Roman Catholic Church who served as Bishop of Camden
 Kimberly Guilfoyle (born 1969), American cable news personality
 Margaret Guilfoyle (1926–2020), British-born Australian Senator
 Merlin Guilfoyle (1908–1981), American prelate of the Roman Catholic Church who served as Bishop of Stockton
 Paul Guilfoyle (born 1949), American television and film actor
 Paul Guilfoyle (actor born in 1902) (1902–1961), American stage, film, and television actor
 Richard Thomas Guilfoyle (1892–1957), third Roman Catholic Bishop of Altoona
 Ronan Guilfoyle (born 1958), Irish jazz musician
 Tony Guilfoyle (born 1960), Irish actor
 William Guilfoyle (1840–1912), Australian landscape gardener and botanist

Surnames
Surnames of Irish origin
Anglicised Irish-language surnames
Surnames of British Isles origin